German submarine U-312 was a Type VIIC U-boat of Nazi Germany's Kriegsmarine during World War II. The submarine was laid down on 10 April 1942 at the Flender Werke yard at Lübeck as yard number 312, launched on 27 February 1943 and commissioned on 21 April under the command of Oberleutnant zur See Kurt-Heinz Nicolay.

During her career, the U-boat sailed on eight combat patrols, but sank no ships. She surrendered on 9 May 1945 and was sunk as part of Operation Deadlight on 29 November 1945.

She was a member of eight wolfpacks.

Design
German Type VIIC submarines were preceded by the shorter Type VIIB submarines. U-312 had a displacement of  when at the surface and  while submerged. She had two shafts and two  propellers.

U-312 was fitted with five  torpedo tubes (four fitted at the bow and one at the stern), fourteen torpedoes, one  SK C/35 naval gun, 220 rounds, and two twin  C/30 anti-aircraft guns. The boat had a complement of between forty-four and sixty.

Service history
After training with the 8th U-boat Flotilla, U-312 was transferred to the 6th flotilla, for front-line service on 1 December 1943. She made the short voyage from Kiel in Germany to Bergen in Norway in the first half of January 1944.

First, second and third patrols
She left Bergen on 23 January 1944 and travelled through the north Norwegian Sea and southwest of Bear Island, arriving in Hammerfest on 29 February.

Her second patrol was similar to the first, sailing through the Norwegian, Greenland and Barents Seas. She docked at Narvik on 12 April 1944.

The boat sortied for a third time from Narvik on 29 April 1944. She arrived back at that port on 13 May and moved to Trondheim.

Fourth and fifth patrols
Her fourth foray was relatively uneventful, starting and finishing in Narvik.

The submarine's fifth patrol was only notable for clearing the North Cape and passing east of Murmansk.

Sixth, seventh and eighth patrols
Patrol number six was slightly different in that it took her as far as the northern Scottish coast, arriving there on 24 December 1944.

The boat was now based at Kilbotn, from whence she sailed on her seventh and eighth patrols.

Surrender and fate
Following the German capitulation, U-312 was moved, first from Kilbotn to Narvik, then to Skjomenfjord before arriving at Loch Eriboll in Scotland on 19 May 1945 in preparation for Operation Deadlight.

References

Bibliography

External links

German Type VIIC submarines
U-boats commissioned in 1943
U-boats sunk in 1945
World War II submarines of Germany
World War II shipwrecks in the Atlantic Ocean
1943 ships
Ships built in Lübeck
Operation Deadlight
Maritime incidents in November 1945